Jagminai (formerly) is a village in Kėdainiai district municipality, in Kaunas County, in central Lithuania. According to the 2011 census, the village had a population of 19 people. It is located next to Nociūnai, among a former "Spike" kolkhoz, the Šerkšnys river and the Želksnys grove. 

There is a furniture workshop.

History

In the beginning of the 20th century, Jagminai was an okolica, a property of the Vaivados and Levitovai families.

Demography

References

Villages in Kaunas County
Kėdainiai District Municipality